H series may refer to:
H series (Toronto subway), a line of subway cars
Isuzu H series, a line of trucks
QI (H series), the eighth series of the TV quiz show QI

See also
 G series (disambiguation)
 I series (disambiguation)